The following tables show the Saarland national football team's all-time international record. The statistics are composed of FIFA World Cup qualifiers, and international friendly matches.

Saarland played their first international fixture against Switzerland on 22 November 1950, which ended in a 5–3 victory for Saarland.

Individual records

Player records

In total, 42 players appeared for the Saarland national team. Waldemar Philippi holds the record for the most caps, appearing in 18 out of the team's 19 matches and only missing a friendly against Uruguay in 1954.

Most caps

All goalscorers

Clean sheets
Two goalkeepers managed to keep a clean sheet in Saarland's nineteen matches.

Manager records

Team records

Performances

Performance by competition

Performance by manager

Performance by venue

Head-to-head record

References

Saarland national football team records and statistics
National association football team records and statistics